Theoxena was the daughter of prince Herodicus, a well-respected person of Thessaly and one of their main leaders.

Life
Philip V of Macedon, who was always planning war against the Romans, ordered the evacuation of most of the coastal towns of Thessaly. The inhabitants were to be moved in small groups to Paeonia, an inland region later called Emathia. Philip heard of slanderous remarks made of him by people that were forced to leave their towns. He decided it would be to his best advantage to arrest the sons of the fathers he had killed earlier and murder them, lest they later plot against him. Philip's brutality was devastating to the family of Theoxena and her sister. Their parents had earlier been killed by Philip and later he murdered their husbands. Theoxena and Archo each had one little son when they became widows. 

Theoxena had several marriage offers from princes, but declined all of them. Archo eventually married a man called Poris, who ranked high among the Aenianes. They had several children together, however she died before the children grew up. In order that Archo's children might be brought up properly and not fall into the hands of another stepmother, Theoxena married Poris, the widowed husband of her sister. This was more for the protection of his children, her nieces and nephews, than for her own benefit.

When she heard of King Philip's plan of arresting the children of those whom he had put to death earlier, she felt sure that the boys would fall victim to the king's devices. She thought up a terrible design and dared to say that she would rather kill the innocent children with her own hands than let them fall into Philip's power. Poris, the father of the children, was horrified at the mere mention of such a deed. He said that he would send them away to some trustworthy friends in Athens and accompany them in their flight. 

One day they went from Thessalonica to Aenia where a festival was being held. It was celebrated with great magnificence every four years with a pageant in honor of Aeneas, the founder of the city. After spending the day in the customary feasting they waited till midnight when all were asleep. Then they secretly went on board a ship, which Poris had waiting in the wings. They pretended they were returning to Thessalonica, but really their ultimate goal was to sail across to Euboea, a safe place for his children. 

Things did not go as planned however. There was a contrary wind and the rowers paddled in vain to get away, however they were forced back to shore where they had just left. At daylight King Philip's soldiers, who were on guard at the harbor, spotted them. Philip ordered an armed boat to be sent to seize the ship containing Theoxena and her family. There were strict orders not to return without it or the men would be punished by death.

Meanwhile, Poris was doing his utmost to urge on the rowers to get away. Poris lifted up his hands from time to time to heaven and implored the gods to help him. Theoxena, a woman of indomitable spirit, fell back on the purpose she had long ago devised and mixed some poison together. She then placed the cup where it could be seen by the children, together with some daggers. Theoxena declared, 

Death alone can free us. Here are two ways of meeting it. Choose each of you which you will, as the escape from the king's tyranny. Come you boys that are the older, to be the first to grasp the knife - or if you would have a more lingering death, drink of the poison.

On the one hand were the enemy ships coming close to them. On the other hand, was the insistent mother urging the children to die. Some chose the one death, some the other. The ones that chose the poison and were still half-alive were thrown overboard from the ship into the sea. Then Theoxena grabbed her husband with her arms and jumped with him into the sea. Philip's sailors took possession of a  ship with no people aboard.

References

Primary sources
Livy's History of Rome: Book 40

Secondary sources
The Ancient History of the Egyptians, Carthaginians, Assyrians, Babylonians, pp. 398–399 by Charles Rollin, published 1851, Harvard University.

External links 
Livy: Book XL in Latin
Livy: Book XL in English

Ancient Roman women in warfare
Ancient Thessalian women
4th-century BC women